Kruzenshtern or Krusenstern is a four-masted barque that was built in 1926 at Geestemünde in Bremerhaven, Germany as Padua (named after the Italian city). She was surrendered to the USSR in 1946 as war reparation and renamed after the early 19th century Baltic German explorer in Russian service, Adam Johann Krusenstern (1770–1846). She is now a Russian sail training ship.

Of the four remaining Flying P-Liners, the former Padua is the only one still in use, mainly for training purposes, with her home ports in Kaliningrad (formerly Königsberg).

As Padua

Launched in 1926 as the last of the P-Liners, Padua was commissioned as a cargo ship, used among other things to ship construction material to Chile, South America, returning with saltpeter around Cape Horn. Later she transported wheat from Australia. Her maiden voyage from Hamburg to Talcahuano, Chile took 87 days. Like all P-liners, Padua was painted according to the colours of the German national flag of the German Empire era: black (hull above water, topsides), white (waterline area) and red (underwater body).

As Kruzenshtern
On 12 January 1946 she was surrendered to the USSR and integrated into the Baltic Fleet of the Soviet Navy. She was moored in Kronstadt harbour until 1961. From 1961 to 1965 she undertook many hydrographic and oceanographical surveys for the Academy of Sciences of the USSR in the Atlantic Ocean, the Caribbean, and Mediterranean, and was used as a training vessel for naval cadets. In 1965 she was transferred to the USSR Ministry of Fisheries in Riga to be used as a schoolship for future fishery officers.

In 1976, Kruzenshtern sailed in the Tall Ships race from Bermuda to Newport and participated in Operation Sail in New York harbor during the United States Bicentennial. Sailors on some of the other ships wondered about her speed and suspected that the captain was occasionally turning on her engines to gain an advantage and called her the “Dieselshtern.”

In January 1981 she was transferred to the "Estonian Fisheries Industry" at Tallinn and in 1991 she became part of the "State Baltic Academy of the Fisheries" fleet with her new home port in Kaliningrad.

Kruzenshtern takes part in international regattas. After the dissolution of the Soviet Union funding became a problem, so passengers are carried for that purpose. In 1995–96 she circumnavigated the world in the trail of her namesake. She again sailed around the world in 2005–06 to commemorate the 200th anniversary of Krusenstern's circumnavigation.

On 23 June 2009 while she was en route to the Charleston, South Carolina Harborfest, her foremast was damaged in a storm off Bermuda when the sail backed and snapped the mast.

On 3 May 2010 she stopped in Bremerhaven after a trip of five months with stops in Vancouver for the 2010 Winter Olympics and in Cuba, after which she returned to Kaliningrad. On 4 August 2014, Kruzenshtern sank the tug Diver Master at Esbjerg, Denmark when a line between the two vessels failed to release. Both vessels sustained damage. On 27 June, she ran aground at Archangelsk. She was refloated that day.

Trivia

The ship has been one of the main attractions during the Norwegian Constitution Day celebration in Larvik, Vestfold.

See also
List of large sailing vessels
List of tall ships

Notes

Further reading
 Burmester, Heinz: Das Rennen Passat contra Padua 1935. Albatros Jg. 34, Bremen, 1989. pp 1–5, ill. Translation of Olof Granquist's account of this journey published in De våra i främmande land, December 1944.
 Burmester, Heinz: Den stora kappseglingen Padua versus Passat. Longitude 17, Stockholm, 1981. pp 28–39, ill.
 Feddersen, Hans-Peter: Acht Tage auf der Krusenstern / Padua. Albatros Jg. 34, Bremen, 1989. pp 26–27.
 Gerdau, Kurt: Viermastbark Padua … ein ruhmreiches Schiff. Koehlers Verlagsgesellschaft, Herford, 1978. 8vo, 99, (5) pp, 12 pl.
 Grönstrand, Lars: Seglande skepps farter. Longitude 3, Stockholm, 1968. pp 30–37, ill.

External links

 Official site, news feed
  The Kruzenshtern: The end of the Tall Ships?
 
 L. Sergeeva (Baltic Fishing Fleet State Academy, Kaliningrad, Russia): Academic and research activities on board STS «Krusenstern»

Photos and videos
 Fine Art Prints of the "Kruzenshtern" ship]
 PHOTOS: Kruzenshtern at Tall Ships Nova Scotia 2009 Festival in Halifax.
 360° QTVR fullscreen panoramas of the "Kruzenshtern" ship]
 Avanzini Photography

Kaliningrad
Individual sailing vessels
Training ships of the Russian Navy
Tall ships of Germany
Tall ships of Russia
Ships of the Soviet Union
Germany–Soviet Union relations
Barques
Four-masted ships
Windjammers
Ships built in Bremen (state)
1926 ships
Auxiliary ships of the Soviet Navy
Maritime incidents in 2014